Willie Brooke (18 December 1895 – 21 January 1939) was a British Trade Union administrator and Labour Party politician.

Brooke, the son of a woolsorter, was born in Bradford. He went to Carlton Street Secondary School; his first job was as an office boy for the Amalgamated Society of Dyers. His work for the Society qualified him for a scholarship to the London Labour College where he studied politics and economics.

A bachelor, in 1925 Brooke was elected to Bradford City Council as a  councillor. He became Chairman of the Governors of his old school, and took a particular interest in 'special schools' for the physically disabled.

At the 1929 general election, Brooke was elected as Member of Parliament (MP) for Dunbartonshire. He lost that seat in 1931, but returned to Parliament in the 1935 general election for Batley and Morley. He suffered poor health from 1938, and stayed at Grassington in North Yorkshire and the Isle of Wight in order to recover, but during the Sudeten Crisis he returned to Westminster.

References
 M. Stenton and S. Lees, "Who's Who of British MPs", Vol. III (Harvester Press, 1979)
 Obituary from "The Times", 23 January 1939.

External links 
 

1895 births
1939 deaths
Councillors in Bradford
Labour Party (UK) MPs for English constituencies
Scottish Labour MPs
UK MPs 1929–1931
UK MPs 1935–1945